Vilangadupakkam, is a suburb located North of Chennai, a metropolitan city in Tamil Nadu, India.

Location
Vilangadupakkam is located in between Madhavaram, Red Hills, Manali New Town and Gnayiru in North of Chennai. The arterial road in Vilangadupakkam is Madhavaram - Arumandai Road.

References

External links
CMDA Official Webpage

Neighbourhoods in Chennai